The Beaumont was a 180-ton ship. Leaving Nantes, France on June 11, 1785, under the command of Captain Daniel, it transported 178 Acadians to New Orleans, Louisiana, arriving August 19, 1785.

External links
History and passenger manifest. 

Age of Sail ships of France
Acadian history
History of Louisiana